Mauro Jörg (born 29 April 1990) is a Swiss professional ice hockey forward who is currently playing for HC Fribourg-Gottéron of the National League (NL). He was selected by the New Jersey Devils in the 7th round (204th overall) of the 2010 NHL Entry Draft.

Playing career
Unsigned from the Devils, and after two seasons with the Rapperswil-Jona Lakers, Jörg signed for his third NL club in agreeing to a three-year contract with HC Davos on 28 May 2014.

On July 3, 2018, Jörg returned to HC Lugano on a two-year deal worth CHF 1.2 million.

On May 30, 2020, Jörg agreed to a one-year contract with Lausanne HC for the 2020/21 season. On October 16, 2020, Jörg was traded to HC Fribourg-Gottéron, without having played a single game for Lausanne, in exchange for Noah Schneeberger.

Career statistics

Regular season and playoffs

International

References

External links

1990 births
Living people
HC Davos players
HC Fribourg-Gottéron players
HC Lugano players
New Jersey Devils draft picks
SC Rapperswil-Jona Lakers players
Swiss ice hockey left wingers
EHC Visp players
People from Chur
Sportspeople from Graubünden